Denis Andreyevich Samoylov (born 15 May 1999) is a Russian football player who plays for FC Yenisey Krasnoyarsk.

Club career
He made his debut in the Russian Football National League for FC Yenisey Krasnoyarsk on 12 August 2020 in a game against FC Neftekhimik Nizhnekamsk.

References

External links
 
 Profile by Russian Football National League
 

1999 births
Sportspeople from Krasnoyarsk
Living people
Russian footballers
Association football midfielders
FC Nosta Novotroitsk players
FC Tekstilshchik Ivanovo players
FC Yenisey Krasnoyarsk players
FC Olimp-Dolgoprudny players
Russian First League players
Russian Second League players